Traffic is a 2016 Indian Hindi-language road thriller film directed by Rajesh Pillai. It is a remake of the 2011 Malayalam film of same name. Originally written by brothers Bobby and Sanjay, the film's screenplay has been adapted into Hindi by Suresh Nair, while the dialogues were penned by Piyush Mishra.

The cinematography is by Santhosh Thundiyil and Anishlal R S, music is by Mithoon. The film features an ensemble cast consisting of Manoj Bajpayee, Jimmy Sheirgill, Prosenjit Chatterjee, Parambrata Chatterjee, Divya Dutta, Amol Parashar and Bollywood debutant Jishnu and Richa Panai.

The film was released on 6 May 2016 to positive reviews. Director Rajesh Pillai and actor Jishnu Raghavan died prior to the release of the movie.

Plot
The story of Traffic takes place over the course of a single day and is inspired by a real-life incident from Chennai, as shown in the credits.

In Mumbai city, Head Constable Ramdas Godbole (Manoj Bajpayee) is shown to join the force after a suspension for taking bribes (he did that in order to help his sister). Also Rehan Ali (Vishal Singh) is a trainee journalist who is all set for his first day of his job.

They are shown to halt at a junction signal where reputed cardiologist Dr. Abel Fernandes (Parambrata Chatterjee) along with his friend Hemaan (Jishnu Raghavan) is also present. However at the signal Rehan and his friend Rajeev (Amol Parashar) face an accident.

Rehan is taken to Aditya Birla Hospital where he is declared brain dead though his heart is still functional. He is put on the ventilator. Elsewhere, in Pune, Superstar Dev Kapoor's (Prosenjit Chatterjee) daughter Ria's (Ulka Gupta) health condition worsens and she is admitted to Fortis Hospital and it is realized that she urgently needs a heart transplant. During the search for a heart, they realize that Rehan's heart is still functional and can be transplanted. Though Rehan's dad Ahmed Ali (Sachin Khedekar) and his mom (Kitu Gidwani) are initially reluctant to remove Rehan from the ventilator, Rehan's best friend Rajeev and Rehan's girlfriend Aditi (Nikita Thukral) convince them that this is to save a life.

Now that the heart is available the only issue is to transport the heart from Mumbai to Pune. Due to weather problems and low visibility conditions, no choppers or aircraft are available to transport the heart. The only option remaining to transport it through road.

They approach Joint Commissioner of Traffic Gurbir Singh (Jimmy Sheirgill) who initially refuses to accept the mission due to the complexity and risk involved in it. However he heeds to the persuasion of Dr. Simon D'Souza and finally agrees to take responsibility of the mission

Due to the risk involved, no police officer comes ahead to take up the challenging task. However Godbole, who wishes to regain the respect he lost due to the bribe incident comes forward volunteering to be the chauffeur of the Tata Safari Storme police van which will transport the heart to Pune. Accompanying him on this mission are Dr. Abel and Rajeev.

Everything goes smoothly for sometime. But at a point Dr. Abel and thus places a knife on Rajeev's neck, forcing Godbole to deviate from the highway into a forest road. However Rajeev retaliates leading to a fight. Abel phones his sister Maria (Kaveri Kalyani) and speaks that he had hit his wife Shwetha (Richa Panai) with a car as he was quite angry with the fact that she was cheating on him with his best friend Hemaan and she has possibly died, so he wishes to save himself from the clutches of the police. Dev Kapoor phones him and convinces him that he can save Abel, however Abel is shown not to be so convinced.
Maya (Divya Dutta), Dev Kapoor's wife explains her mental traumatic condition due to the heart problem of her daughter for the last 13 years. And explains that no other problem can be bigger than this one. Abel gets convinced and advises Godbole and Rajeev to leave. However Godbole decides to have Abel with them and in spite of the repeated suggestions from the Commissioner Gurbir to get him arrested, he has him in the mission.

Godbole crosses places at high speeds till they come to a point where the road has been blocked by the police as a tanker has faced an accident. Back in Mumbai Gurbir's team discuss that if they were  behind they could have taken the NH4 Diversion and reached. However they discuss that a communally very sensitive area Bilal Colony falls on this route and it might be difficult to get through here. Godbole listening to all this through the wireless decides to turn the vehicle and take the Bilal Colony route. Gurbir informs that it is impossible for the police to do anything here due to the strong minority and that the mission now depends on public and its support.

Dev Kapoor phones Aslam Khan (Raj Arjun) an influential person in Bilal Colony who goes out of his ways in order to ensure that there is no obstruction to the police van. Rajeev knows the place very well and thus exits the vehicle as soon as they enter the colony to ensure the roads are clear. In midway, Dr. Abel also exits the vehicle to remove two vehicles which are blocking the route.

Gurbir informs Godbole that there is a group of pilgrims going to Pandharpur will come on their road and Godbole has to ensure that he crosses the road before they reach. However Aslam talks to the secretary of the group and sends his men to stop them till the vehicle crosses them, after which Abel boards the car by Aslam's assistance, and Rajeev after a long run is able to board the car. Godbole drives at high speeds and ensures that they reach Fortis Hospital at time, covering the challenging feat in about two hours.

Abel learns from his sister-in-law that Shwetha did not die and has no complaints regarding the accident against him, thus freeing him. Rehan's parents invite Aditi home as a symbol of acceptance a Ria opens her eyes, bringing joy to her family, Gurbir feels a sense of satisfaction and phones Dr. Simon D'Souza to thank him. Godbole en route to his home finds a few people fighting on the road regarding a minor accident, where he signals them to stop the fight. Thus the movie ends on a happy note.

Cast

 Manoj Bajpayee as Ramdas Godbole, a head constable in Mumbai Traffic Police
 Jimmy Sheirgill as Gurbir Singh IPS, Joint Commissioner (Traffic), Mumbai Police
 Prosenjit Chatterjee as Dev Kapoor, Maya's husband and Ria's father
 Parambrata Chatterjee as Dr. Abel Fernandes, a reputed cardiac surgeon
 Jishnu Raghavan as Hemaan, Abel's friend,   who has an affair with Abel's wife Shwetha
 Vishal Singh as Rehan Ali, journalist trainee and Aditi's boyfriend 
 Sachin Khedekar as Ahmed Ali, Rehan's father
 Kitu Gidwani as Rehan's mother
 Amol Parashar as Rajeev, Rehan's friend
 Sija Rose as Rehan's friend and Rajeev's girlfriend
 Kaveri Kalyani as Maria Fernandes, Abel's sister
 Divya Dutta as Maya Kapoor, Dev Kapoor's wife
 Ulka Gupta as Ria Kapoor, Dev Kapoor's daughter
 Nikita Thukral as Aditi, Rehan's girlfriend
 Richa Panai as Shwetha Fernandes, Abel's wife
 Baby Annie as Godbole's Daughter
 Janeshwar Shukla as Dr. A. Dastur, cardiac surgeon
 Jasbir Thandi as Traffic Police Officer
 Sandra S.Jaichandran
 Tuhin Chakrabarty
 Rajesh Khattar as Dr. Jagdish Khattar, Head, Cardiology Department, Aditya Birla Hospital, Mumbai
 Raj Arjun as Aslam bhai
 Vikram Gokhale as Dr. Simon D'Souza, Head, Aditya Birla Hospital-Mumbai

The supporting cast includes Ann Zibi, Amit Roy, Manuj Bhaskar, Raj Arjun, Syed Zafar Ali, Leena Panchal, Talib Mehdi, Satyajeet Bhattacharya, Ritika Murthy, Sheron Kurian A., Raj Gopal Iyer, Ritesh Raghuvanshi, Sanjay Gurubaxani, Mohd Rashid Ghaswala, Vijay Sanap, Manish Sharma, Harish Shashi Nair, Santosh Krishnan, Shahrukh B Sadri, Sandeep Singh Chopra, Premchand Singh, Gunjan Khare, Sagar Kale, Avesh Khan, Amit Shukla, Hagupreet Singh, Raj Singh, Ajay Arya, Nidha Bhat and Sameer Gogate.

Production
Endemol India that has produced several local television shows ventured into feature films, after they acquired the remake rights for the Malayalam film Traffic. Rajesh Pillai who directed the film in Malayalam was retained as director too. Suresh Nair did the Hindi adaptation of the script of Traffic, stating "slight enhancements have been made in the feel and action content, to ensure commercial viability. But the script still remains the brilliant script that the original is".

Manoj Bajpai was signed to play the male lead in April 2013.

Two Bengali actors, Parambrata Chatterjee and Prosenjit Chatterjee were also signed in. The director confirmed that Manoj Bajpai would play the role of a constable, Parambrata Chatterjee would play a doctor and Prosenjit Chatterjee would play a superstar.

Divya Dutta signed the film in August, playing Lena's part from the original.

Amol Parashar, a popular face through ad films, is said to play Asif Ali's character and Malayali actor, Jishnu is said to be playing the role played by Krishna in the original version.

Vishal Singh signed in August and Kitu Gidwani has been given the role of Vishal Singh's mother.

In November 2013, it was reported that Malayali actress Kaveri would reprise the role portrayed by Roma Asrani but that she will portray a mature and introvert personality as opposed to a bubbly Miriam from the original.

Mithoon was signed as the music composer and had already recorded three songs for the film by May 2013.

Pillai stated that the film would be entirely shot on the Mumbai Pune Expressway and Hyderabad. In late August, the first schedule had been completed at Hyderabad. The final schedule started on 2 September at Mumbai.

Release 
The movie was released, 2 months after the death of its director Rajesh Pillai

Critical reception 
Meena Iyer of The Times of India gave it 4 stars out of 5, describing film as a well-intentioned movie with fine performances from its ensemble cast. Anna MM Vetticad of Firstpost quoted that it is Needless messaging which spoils this Manoj Bajpayee-starrer. Shubhra Gupta of The Indian Express gave it 2 stars out of 5, and quoted that Crispness and the sense of urgency is missing in movie. Saibal Chatterjee of NDTV gave it 4 stars out of 5, describing the film as a fitting swan song: an unmissable film.

Sweta Kaushal of Hindustan Times gave it 4 stars out of 5, titled that A Tight script, stellar performances make it a must-watch. Prarthna Sarkar of International Business Times gave it 3 stars out of 5, describing it as a must watch. Namarta Joshi of The Hindu quoted "'Traffic' wears thin, feels rushed. There is neither much of an emotional tug nor an edge-of-the-seat urgency that the film promised to deliver." Sukanya Verma from Rediff.com gave it 2 stars out of 5, said movie is muddled and lacklustre in its set-up. Bollywood Hungama gave it 2 stars out of 5. Nandini Ramnath of Scroll.in said that the remake of the Malayalam hit loses the essence of the original and movie titled Traffic goes nowhere.

Box office 
As the movie did not cross the breakeven point, it is considered as a box-office failure.

Music
Music for Traffic was composed by Mithoon and Shailendra Barve, while the lyrics were written by Turaz, Mithoon, Jitendra Joshi & Sayeed Quadri.

Awards and nominations

References

External links
 

Indian road movies
2010s road movies
2010s thriller films
Indian films based on actual events
Hindi remakes of Malayalam films
Fox Star Studios films
Films directed by Rajesh Pillai